David Dixon is a British actor who played the role of Ford Prefect on The Hitchhiker's Guide to the Galaxy.

David Dixon is also the name of:

 David Dixon (businessman) (1923–2010), American businessman and sports executive who helped create the New Orleans Saints NFL team and the United States Football League.
 David Dixon (American football) (born 1969), New Zealand native who was an NFL offensive lineman with the Minnesota Vikings
 David Dixon (golfer) (born 1977), winner of the 2008 St Omer Open and former low amateur at the British Open
 David Dixon (footballer) (1898–after 1930), English professional footballer
 David Dippie Dixon (1842–1929), amateur historian in Northumberland

See also
 David Dickson (disambiguation)
 David Dixon Award